The Eddie Read Stakes is a Grade II American Thoroughbred horse race for three-year-olds and older over a distance of one and one-eighth miles on the turf course scheduled annually in late July or early August at Del Mar Racetrack in Del Mar, California. The event currently carries a purse of $250,000.

History

The inaugural running of the event was on 25 August 1974 as the Eddie Read Handicap with Elmendorf Farm's My Old Friend winning as the 9-1 longshot winning by  length in a time of 1:49. The event was named in honor of William E. (Eddie) Read who served as the publicity directory at Del Mar and died 28 May 1973.

In 1980 the event was upgrade by the Thoroughbred Owners and Breeders Association to Grade III. Two years later the event upgraded once more to Grade II. With the stake money increasing yearly and the quality of the entrants running the race performing well in high level events the event was upgraded to the highest classification of Grade I in 1988.

In the Breeders' Cup era the event became a logical preparatory race for both the Breeders' Cup Mile and Breeders' Cup Turf. The 1993 winner of the event, the French-bred Kotashaan, went on to win the Breeders' Cup Turf and later was voted to win US Champion Male Turf Horse and US Horse of the Year honors.

In 2006 the Irish-bred Aragorn set a new stakes and track record of 1:44.79 winning by four lengths as a 3-2 favorite.

In 2009 the conditions of the event were changed from handicap to stakes allowance and the name of the event was modified to the Eddie Read Stakes.

In 2016 the event was downgraded to Grade II.

Records
Speed  record:
 1:44.79 - Aragorn (2006) (new race and course record)

Margins:
 5 lengths - Special Ring (2003)

Most wins:
 2 - United (2020, 2021)
 2 - Wickerr (1981, 1982)
 2 - Fastness (1995, 1996)
 2 - Special Ring (2003, 2004)
 2 - Acclamation (2011, 2012)

Most wins by an owner:
 3 - Edmund A. Gann (1981, 1982, 1986)

Most wins by a jockey:
 5 - Corey Nakatani (1994, 1996, 2002, 2006, 2009)

Most wins by a trainer:
 7 - Robert J. Frankel (1977, 1981, 1982, 1986, 1989, 1992, 1997)

Winners

Notes:

§ Ran as an entry

See also
 List of American and Canadian Graded races

External links
 2020 Del Mar Media Guide

References

Del Mar Racetrack
Horse races in California
Open mile category horse races
Recurring sporting events established in 1974
1974 establishments in California
Graded stakes races in the United States
Grade 2 stakes races in the United States
Turf races in the United States